The FIFA Ethics Committee is one of FIFA's three judicial bodies. It is organized in two chambers, the Investigatory Chamber and the Adjudicatory Chamber. Its duties are regulated by several official documents, most importantly the FIFA Code of Ethics. FIFA's other judicial bodies are the Disciplinary Committee and the Appeal Committee.

Investigatory Chamber
The Investigatory Chamber's main task is to investigate potential violations of the FIFA Code of Ethics. Investigations can be carried out at any time, on the discretion of the Investigatory Chamber. In prima facie cases, the chamber has to open investigations. The chamber has to inform all parties involved that an investigation is being carried out, except for situations in which such information could harm the investigations. Investigatory methods include written inquiries and interviews with the parties and other witnesses. Investigations can, if necessary, be conducted by several members of the chamber and can also be assisted by third parties. At the end of an investigation, the chamber delivers a final report to the Adjudicatory Chamber. Should new and important information regarding an investigation come to light, however, the chamber can reopen an investigatory process.

Adjudicatory Chamber
The Adjudicatory Chamber has to review the reports of the Investigatory Chamber and decide whether a case should be proceeded or closed. The Adjudicatory Chamber has the right to return a report to the Investigatory Chamber or carry out further investigations on its own behalf. After reviewing a report of the Investigatory Chamber and after conducting further investigations if deemed necessary, the Adjudicatory Chamber sends a report to all parties involved and asks for their statements.

In addition, the Adjudicatory Chamber has to finally decide on appropriate sanctions. Sanctions must relate to the three fundamental documents regulating the conduct of any person related to FIFA. These documents are the FIFA Code of Ethics, the FIFA Disciplinary Code and the FIFA Statutes. Thus, sanctions can range from warnings and reprimands for lesser cases of misbehavior up to lifelong bans on taking part in any football-related activity worldwide.

Membership
The chairmen of FIFA's judicial bodies and their deputies are elected directly by the FIFA Congress and can only be deposed from their offices by the FIFA Congress. The term of office is four years, members can however be re-elected. Chairmen and deputy chairmen of both chambers have to be qualified to practice law and the individual members of the two chambers should be put together in order to ensure an overall high degree of qualifications with regard to their task. In addition, the members of the Ethics Committee should also represent the respective FIFA member associations in an appropriate way.

The members of FIFA's judicial bodies must not serve as members of the Executive Committee or any other of FIFA's standing committees.

Independence
The chairmen and deputy chairmen of the two chambers of the Ethics Committee as well as the chairman of the FIFA Audit and Compliance Committee have to fulfill the independence criteria set up in the Standing Orders of the Congress.

To ensure that the independence criteria are met by the respective committee members, annual reviews of the incumbent chairmen and deputy chairmen as well as candidates for chairmen and deputy chairmen of the Ethics Committee and the Audit and Compliance Committee are mandatory. Reviews must be conducted by another committee. Therefore, the Ethics Committee's members are being reviewed by the Audit and Compliance Committee, which in turn is being reviewed by the Investigatory Chamber of the Ethics Committee.

In addition, the Ethics Committee conducts the integrity checks for the following FIFA offices: FIFA President, all members of the Executive Committee, chairman, deputy chairman and members of the Audit and Compliance Committee, and all chairmen, deputy chairmen and members of FIFA's judicial bodies, with the obvious exception of the Ethics Committee itself, which is checked by the Audit and Compliance Committee. No FIFA committee is allowed to review or check its own members.

Members

History
Since 1998, FIFA has implemented an increasing number of rules and regulations intended to modernize and improve the accountability and transparency of its governance processes. In the wake of accusations of bribery of referees in 2006, FIFA decided to create an Ethics Committee, with the aim of investigating allegations of corruption in football. In the beginning, the Ethics Committee was first headed by Sebastian Coe, and between 2010 and 2012 by the former Swiss football player and attorney at law Claudio Sulser.

However, it was not until 2011 that Mark Pieth, a criminal law professor at the University of Basel, Switzerland, and head of the so-called FIFA Independent Governance Committee (IGC), started to assess the FIFA-structures. Pieth subsequently published a report with suggestions for an indepth reform of the Ethics Committee in order to establish a modernized body for FIFA-internal investigations and jurisdiction. The ICG was constituted as an external advisory board for FIFA by the Executive Committee on 17 December 2011. It had a mandate until the end of 2013.

In the beginning, the IGC-report received substantial criticism, including from within the IGC itself. Sylvia Schenk, sports adviser of Transparency International (TI), criticized that Pieth received payments from FIFA for his work. Schenk refrained from becoming a member of IGC. Roger A. Pielke, Jr., who also authored an publication on the accountability of FIFA, stated in his blog The Least Thing that Pieth, or his Basel-based Institute of Governance, had received USD 128,000 for his work and could therefore not be regarded as acting independent. Pieth, however, replied that it is best practice for any organization to remunerate audit reports, because "we can't start asking audit firms to do their job for free just to make sure they are independent."

Much controversy also erupted around the question whether the IGC should be allowed to take a stance on earlier cases of potential corruption. Meanwhile, this issue has been codified in the 2012 FIFA Code of Ethics. The Ethics Committee’s Investigatory Chamber has the right to investigate into previous allegations of bribery.

The FIFA Ethics Committee has a history of corruption and controversy. The 2014 World Cup in Brazil was criticized for fraudulent billing and producing hundreds of tons of waste from the building and usage of stadiums. From 2014 and on, pressure built as the public and the media recognized inconsistencies and policy violations in FIFA-run tournaments. The FIFA Ethics Committee struggles, according to Sahiba Gill of "Whose Game? FIFA, Corruption, and the Challenge of Global Governance", to understand why its past reforms and public addresses don't suffice, and why they should ultimately resort to complete public transparency.

The ethics committee continues to be accused, by Paul MacInnes of The Guardian, of lacking decency and awareness to publicly recognize these problems. One problem that was recognized by the committee in 2014, was the bribery involving referees receiving expensive watches from Brazilian higher-ups. A document from the United States Department of Justice described in full detail the sentencing of nine FIFA officials and five FIFA executive. Not only was this blatant and beyond face-saving, but was detrimental to the tournament and its no-tolerance policies against bribery. Scholars estimate that FIFA's past two decades of corruption totals around $150 million. Even though FIFA is governed by Swiss law, authorities there have largely ignored the allegations toward FIFA and its ethics committee until confronted by U.S. authorities in 2015.

In 2010, Qatar was chosen to be the first Middle Eastern country to host a World Cup. Not only was this debated and controversial because of law differences, but also because of well-documented human rights atrocities. Sepp Blatter, former president and president at the time of selection, was quoted saying that "It was a bad choice". Despite this, the FIFA Ethics Committee gave the seal of approval on Qatar as the 2022 World Cup host.

The FIFA Ethics Committee was put in place to police and regulate foul play and poor decisions made by FIFA representatives. The committee's history with policy violations and human rights debates have attracted concerns that FIFA lacks the competency and discipline to address them. A lack of consideration of human rights in the committee showed that while the public recognized the difficulties with selecting Qatar as the next host, they were willing to look past these claims by the media/public. Qatar's recent history with media claims of tolerating human rights atrocities and having a disregard for FIFA's policies, proved a difficult task for FIFA to handle and cover up. FIFA announced its first human rights policy in 2017 following the decision for Qatar to host the 2022 World Cup.

The conversation surrounding human rights violations started primarily in reference to Qatar's mistreatment involving migrant workers which make up 90% of its labor force. In addition to human rights violations, the FIFA Ethics Committee gave Qatar the go ahead despite the controversy surrounding its temperatures of 50 degrees Celsius (122 degrees Fahrenheit) during the summer months. This is another public criticism that wasn't confronted despite the numerous complaints mentioning heat exhaustion and the countless other bids from countries that would be far more suitable as a host.

Speaking on Qatar's questionable behavior, Hans-Joachim Eckert, head of the adjudicatory arm of FIFA’s ethics committee, mentioned that “the effects of these occurrences on the bidding process as a whole were far from reaching any threshold that would require returning to the bidding process, let alone reopening it”.

Investigatory Chamber and the Adjudicatory Chamber

Following suggestions of the IGC's first report in 2012, the FIFA Executive Committee decided to establish two independent entities, the Investigatory Chamber and the Adjudicatory Chamber, headed by experienced and independent legal professionals. The Ethics Committee is allowed to investigate present as well as previous allegations.

In 2016, committee member Juan Pedro Damiani was being subjected to an internal investigation over the legal assistance he had provided as a lawyer to Eugenio Figueredo, a football official who had been charged by US authorities with wire fraud and money laundering, as part of the 2015 FIFA corruption case. After a preliminary investigation was opened by the Ethics Committee's Investigatory Chamber, Damiani resigned from the Ethics Committee on 6 April 2016.

In early 2017 reports became public about FIFA president Gianni Infantino attempting to prevent the re-elections of both chairmen of the ethics committee during the FIFA congress in May 2017. On 9 May 2017, following Infantino's proposal, the FIFA Council decided not to renew the mandates of Cornel Borbély and Hans-Joachim Eckert. Together with the chairmen, eleven of 13 committee members were removed. Borbely and Eckert claimed that when ousted, they were in the process of investigating hundreds of cases and that their removal was a "setback for the fight against corruption" and that "meant the de facto end of Fifa's reform efforts".

Football officials banned
Football officials banned by FIFA Ethics Committee include:

  Amos Adamu
  Sayed Aghazada
  Ahmad Ahmad
  Chabour Goc Alei
   Ganbold Bayannemekh
  Ariel Alvarado
  Franz Beckenbauer
  Luis Bedoya
  Sepp Blatter
  Chuck Blazer
  Edmond Bowen
  Rafael Leonardo Callejas Romero
  Adeel Carelse
  Ibrahim Chaibou
  Luis Chiriboga
  Najeeb Chirakal
  David Chung
  Albert Colaco
  Aaron Davidson
  Eduardo Deluca
  Domingo Mituy Edjang
  Rafael Esquivel
  Koukou Hougnimon Fagla
  Yvette Félix
  Vernon Manilal Fernando
   Eugenio Figueredo
  Steve Goddard
  Johan Wesley Gonjuan
  Rosnick Grant
  Mohammed bin Hammam
  Lionel Haven
  Alfredo Hawit
  Issa Hayatou
  Sergio Jadue
  Yves Jean-Bart
  Musa Hassan Bility
  Brayan Jiménez
  Nella Joseph
  Abu Bakarr Kabba
  Kerramuudin Karim
   Markus Kattner
  Lindile Kika
  Mooketsi Kgotlele
  Richard K. Lai
   Nicolás Leoz
  Eduardo Li
  Julio Rocha López
  Worawi Makudi
  Jamal Malinzi
  Oden Charles Mbaga
  José Maria Marin
  José Luis Meiszner
  Boniface Mwamelo
  Harold Mayne-Nicholls
  Jean Guy Blaise Mayolas
  Saoud Al-Mohannadi
  Chung Mong-joon
  Sadio Jose Mugadza
  Jonathan Musavengana
  Juan Ángel Napout
  Manuel Irénio Lopes Nascimento
  Tai Nicholas
 Kirsten Nematandani
  Patrice Edouard Ngaissona
  Wolfgang Niersbach
  Romer Osuna
  Constant Omari
  Michel Platini
  Sediqi Rustam
  Rafael Salguero
  Enrique Sanz de Santamaria
  Leslie Sedibe
  Manuel Burga Seoane
  Alexander Shprygin
  Samson Siasia
  Viphet Sihachakr
  Costas Takkas
  Bana Tchanilé
  Reynald Temarii
  Ricardo Texeira
  Ganesh Thapa
  Jérôme Valcke
  Badji Mombo Wantete 
  Daryll Warner
  Jack Warner
  Jeffrey Webb
  Obert Zhoya

References

External links
 FIFA Ethics Committee 

FIFA Committees